Busunya is a town in the Bono East Region of Ghana. The town is known for the Busunya High School.  The school is a second cycle institution. Busunya also has a health centre.

References

Populated places in the Bono East Region